Ironstone is a type of sedimentary rock.

Ironstone may also refer to:

Joe Ironstone (1898–1972), Canadian professional ice hockey player 
Ironstone Bank, a community bank in the southern United States
Ironstone china, a type of tableware
Ironstone Creek, a tributary of the Manatawny Creek in Pennsylvania
Ironstone, Massachusetts, United States, a village
Ironstone, South Australia, a locality on Kangaroo Island
Ironstone Mountain, in the central highlands of Tasmania, Australia
Ironstone Vineyards, a winery in California, United States